A life partner is a long-term romantic partner.

Life partner may also refer to:

 Life Partner, a 2009 Bollywood film
 Life Partners, a 2014 American film
 Life Partners, Inc., an American life settlement provider

See also
 Life Partnership Act